The 2012 WEC 6 Hours of Spa-Francorchamps was held at Circuit de Spa-Francorchamps on May 5, 2012.  It was the second round of the 2012 FIA World Endurance Championship season. Following the cancellation of  the Zolder round of 2012 European Le Mans Series season, some ELMS teams were invited to enter the race. Two major entries on the original entry list withdrew from the event before the race week: the No.7 Toyota TS030 Hybrid due to a testing accident, and the new Pescarolo 03 of Pescarolo Team, due to a delay in production.

Qualifying

Qualifying Result
Pole position winners in each class are marked in bold.

Race

Race result
Class winners in bold.  Cars failing to complete 70% of winner's distance (112 laps) marked as Not Classified (NC).

References

6 Hours of Spa-Francorchamps
Spa
Six hours of Spa